Jennifer Hoi-kw Tam (born 27 May 1996) is an Australian badminton player. She won the women's doubles title at the 2016 Oceania Championships partnered with Tiffany Ho. Tam also won the BWF event of Waikato International tournament in the women's doubles event.

Achievements

Oceania Championships 
Women's singles

Women's doubles

BWF International Challenge/Series 
Women's doubles

  BWF International Challenge tournament
  BWF International Series tournament
  BWF Future Series tournament

References

External links 
 

Living people
1996 births
Sportswomen from New South Wales
Australian people of Chinese descent
Australian female badminton players